Stephen Alexander Lesser (born July 15, 1944) is an American architect, in practice in East Hampton, New York, specializing in modern residential and commercial buildings in the school of Le Corbusier.  He is perhaps best known for his work on Faneuil Hall Marketplace project in downtown Boston, MA.

Biography

Education

Lesser was born in Bethesda, Maryland, the son of Virginia Hirst Lesser, a painter and teacher of art and piano, and Dr. Alexander Lesser, a Hofstra University professor of anthropology.  He was raised in Manhasset, New York and graduated from Manhasset High School, where he was editor-in-chief of the literary magazine and a member of the National Honor Society.  He graduated from Columbia University in 1966 with a B.A in Social Sciences.  He received a Master of Architecture from the Graduate School of Design at Harvard University in 1972.

Career

Beginning in 1971, Lesser worked at several Boston firms, including The Architects Collaborative (TAC), and Perry Dean and Partners before joining Benjamin C. Thompson and Associates.  There, he worked for two years on the Faneuil Hall Marketplace project.

In 1975, Lesser moved his practice to New York.  He joined Richard Meier Associates where he honed his Corbusian style in residential and commercial buildings. He later joined Rivkin/Weisman, PC where he worked his way up to director. In 1986, he formed Nagel and Lesser, Architects moving to East Hampton.  The practice included a broad range of residential, commercial, and industrial projects.  Since 1994, he has been a sole practitioner.

Teaching
Appointments: Columbia, guest lecturer in Architecture and Planning (1992–94)
New York Institute of Technology (1994-2004)

Guest Critic: Yale, Harvard, University of Pennsylvania, NYIT, Columbia, Roger Williams University

Licenses
Certified: National Council of Architectural Registration Boards, 1975

Registered: Massachusetts (1975), New York, (1981), and New Jersey (1993)

Member: AIA/National, State and AIA Peconic Chapter

Publications

Architectural Review "Credit DuNord Offices" November 1982, pp 46–7

Yale Perspecta

Architectural Record "The Dubai Bank" January 1983, pp 85–91

Progressive Architecture "Bavarian Emissary" September 1984, 100-105

The New York Times "From Blueprint to Imprint" November 21, 1993

Newsday "A Carriage Trade" October 16, 1994, pp 26–27

Awards

American Institute of Architecture/Long Island  Chapter: 
Residential,(Shyer House 1993)  
Institutional (Camp Blue Bay 1986) and 
Young Firm (1993)

Architectural Record: Record House and Record Interiors

Beauxarch IV: Commercial Project (Viking Lines, 1986)

Personal

Lesser lives in East Hampton with his wife, Celia, who is an attorney. They have three children: Jonathan (born '95), Emma (born '93), and Alexandra (born '88). Jon attends the Ross School in East Hampton along with his sister Emma. Alexandra graduated Hampshire College in 2010.

References

External links
Stephen Alexander Lesser, Architect
Fanueil Hall Marketplace
TAC
Benjamin Thompson
Harvard Graduate School of Design
Le Corbusier
The New York Times

1944 births
20th-century American architects
Columbia College (New York) alumni
Living people
People from Bethesda, Maryland
Architects from Maryland
People from Manhasset, New York
Harvard Graduate School of Design alumni
People from East Hampton (town), New York
Manhasset High School alumni
21st-century American architects